The men's 3000 metres steeplechase competition at the 2006 Asian Games in Doha, Qatar was held on 8 December 2006 at the Khalifa International Stadium.

Schedule
All times are Arabia Standard Time (UTC+03:00)

Records

Results 
Legend
DNF — Did not finish
DNS — Did not start

References 

Athletics at the 2006 Asian Games
2006